Parotocinclus cabessadecuia is a species of catfish in the family Loricariidae. It is a freshwater species native to South America, where it occurs in the Parnaíba River basin of Brazil, alongside its congeners Parotocinclus haroldoi and Parotocinclus cearensis. The species reaches at least 3.32 cm (1.3 inches) SL. It was described in 2017 by T. P. Ramos, S. M. Lima, and R. T. Ramos. FishBase does not list this species.

References 

Otothyrinae
Taxa named by Telton Pedro Anselmo Ramos
Fish described in 2017
Freshwater fish of Brazil